Andrea Brancaccio, C.R. (1644 – 4 June 1725) was a Roman Catholic prelate who served as Archbishop of Cosenza (1701–1725) and Bishop of Conversano (1681–1701).

Biography
Andrea Brancaccio was born in Naples, Italy in 1644 and ordained a priest in the Congregation of Clerics Regular of the Divine Providence.
On 13 January 1681, he was appointed during the papacy of Pope Innocent XI as Bishop of Conversano. 
On 26 January 1681, he was consecrated bishop by Alessandro Crescenzi (cardinal), Bishop of Recanati e Loreto, with Pier Antonio Capobianco, Bishop Emeritus of Lacedonia, and Antonio Savo de' Panicoli, Bishop of Termoli, serving as co-consecrators. 
On 18 April 1701, he was appointed during the papacy of Pope Clement XI as Archbishop of Cosenza. 
He served as Archbishop of Cosenza until his death on 4 June 1725.

While bishop, he was the principal co-consecrator of Nicola Cirillo, Bishop of Nicastro (1692).

References

External links and additional sources
 (for Chronology of Bishops) 
 (for Chronology of Bishops) 
 (for Chronology of Bishops) 
 (for Chronology of Bishops) 

17th-century Italian Roman Catholic bishops
18th-century Italian Roman Catholic archbishops
Bishops appointed by Pope Innocent XI
Bishops appointed by Pope Clement XI
1644 births
1725 deaths
Clergy from Naples
Theatine bishops